Baldo may refer to:

 Baldo (name), a list of people with the given name or surname
Baldo (Hector Cantú comic strip), an American comic strip
Baldo (Italian comics), an Italian comic strip
 Baldo (video game), an action-adventure video game
 Monte Baldo, a mountain range in the Italian Alps
 Alaparma Baldo, an Italian monoplane
 "Baldo", a 16th-century narrative poem written by Teofilo Folengo
 Baldo, a gimmick of wrestler Matt Bloom

See also
Balto, a sled dog